Ana Maria Carvalho is a Brazilian sociolinguist and a professor of linguistics within the Department of Spanish and Portuguese at the University of Arizona.  She is the author of several books and articles on sociolinguistics and language acquisition.

Career
Carvalho holds a PhD in Hispanic Linguistics from the University of California at Berkeley. Currently, she holds the title of Professor in the Department of Spanish and Portuguese at the University of Arizona and is also a member of the faculty of the Second Language Acquisition and Teaching (SLAT) Program and the Center for Latin American Studies. Her research interests include language change and variation, bilingualism, language contact, language attitude, and dialect and language acquisition. Much of her work has explored the relationship between Portuguese and Spanish as it relates to both language acquisition and sociolinguistics, the latter marked by her contributions to the study of Portuñol.

Bibliography

Books

Articles

Awards and honors
Executive Council. American Association of Teachers of Spanish and Portuguese (AATSP). 2003-2005.
University of Arizona College of Humanities Distinguished Advising and Mentoring Award. Spring 2002.

References

External links

Carvalho Ana Maria
University of California, Berkeley
University of Arizona faculty
Living people
Year of birth missing (living people)
Brazilian expatriate academics in the United States
American academics
American people of Brazilian descent